Kujō Station (九条駅) is a railway station in Yamatokōriyama, Nara Prefecture, Japan. It is on the Kintetsu Kashihara Line.

Lines 
 Kintetsu Railway
 Kashihara Line

Platforms and tracks 
The station has two side platforms serving one track each.

History
 1921—Kujō Station was opened on the Unebi Line by the Osaka Electric Tramway.
 1941—It was owned by the Kansai Express Railway that merged with the Sangu Express Railway.
 2002—The building of the station was rebuilt underground.
 Apr. 1, 2007—PiTaPa, a reusable contactless stored value smart card, has been available.

External links
 
 

Railway stations in Nara Prefecture